Abraham and Maria LeFevre House is a historic home located at Gardiner in Ulster County, New York.  It is a long, rectangular -story stone dwelling capped by a steep gable roof.  It was built in three stages between 1742 and 1798.

It was listed on the National Register of Historic Places in 2006.

References

Houses on the National Register of Historic Places in New York (state)
Houses completed in 1798
Houses in Ulster County, New York
National Register of Historic Places in Ulster County, New York